Annie Foreman-Mackey (born 25 June 1991) is a Canadian professional racing cyclist. She won the bronze medal in the women's individual pursuit event at the 2016 UCI Track Cycling World Championships. She qualified to represent Canada at the 2020 Summer Olympics. In 2022, she officially retired from cycling.

Personal life 
Annie currently holds a Honours Bachelor of Health Sciences from McMaster University (2009-14) and a Masters of Public Health from the University of Toronto (2014-18) with a focus on harm reduction research and advocacy. She is currently attending medical school at the University of British Columbia.

Major results
2015
Pan-American Track Championships
2nd Team Pursuit (with Allison Beveridge, Kirsti Lay and Stephanie Roorda)
3rd Individual Pursuit
2017
2nd  Team Pursuit, Round 1, (Pruszków) Track Cycling World Cup (with Ariane Bonhomme, Allison Beveridge and Kinley Gibson)

References

External links

1991 births
Living people
Canadian female cyclists
Place of birth missing (living people)
Canadian track cyclists
Cyclists at the 2018 Commonwealth Games
Commonwealth Games medallists in cycling
Commonwealth Games bronze medallists for Canada
Olympic cyclists of Canada
Cyclists at the 2020 Summer Olympics
21st-century Canadian women
Medallists at the 2018 Commonwealth Games